The year 1689 in music involved some significant events.

Events
September 1 – Johann Joseph Vilsmayr begins work at the Hofkapelle in Salzburg.
Nicolaus Bruhns is appointed town organist at Husum.

Published popular music
Henry Purcell – Musick's Handmaid

Classical music
Jean-Henri d'Anglebert – Pièces de clavecin
Giovanni Battista Bassani – Giona (oratorio)
Giovanni Paolo Colonna – Sacre lamentationi della Settimana santa a voce sola
Arcangelo Corelli – Op. 3, 12 trio sonatas
Michel Richard Delalande  
Audite caeli, S.7
Quam dilecta S.12
De Profundis S.23
Domenico Gabrielli
 Seven ricercari for solo cello 
 Cello Sonata No. 1 and No. 2
Johann Caspar Kerll – Missae sex, cum instrumentis concertantibus, a collection of concertato masses
Johann Kuhnau – Neuer Clavier-Übung, erster Theil
Michel Lambert 
Airs de cour
Airs à une, II. III. et IV. parties avec la basse-continue
Giovanni Battista Vitali – Artificii musicali (Op. 13)

Opera
Antonio Caldara – L'Argene
Henri Desmarest – La Diane de Fontainebleau
Henry Purcell – Dido and Aeneas (libretto by Nahum Tate, first performed in London)
Poul Christian Schindler – Der vereinigte Götterstreit
Agostino Steffani – La Lotta d'Ercole con Acheloo

Births
February 27 – Pietro Gnocchi, composer (died 1775)
September 30 – Jacques Aubert, composer (died 1753)
November 3 – Johann Joseph Ignaz Brentner, composer (died 1742)
December 23 – Joseph Bodin de Boismortier, composer (died 1755)
date unknown – Edward Purcell, organist and co-founder of the Royal Society of Musicians (died 1740)

Deaths
November 13 – Philipp von Zesen, hymn-writer (born 1619)

 
17th century in music
Music by year